What's Autumn? (and also known as What Does Fall Mean?) is a 1977 Argentine drama film directed by Daniel Portela and David José Kohon. The film was selected as the Argentine entry for the Best Foreign Language Film at the 50th Academy Awards, but was not accepted as a nominee.

Cast
 Alfredo Alcón
 Dora Baret
 Fernanda Mistral
 Alberto Argibay
 Aldo Barbero
 Javier Portales
 Flora Steinberg
 Alicia Zanca
 Catalina Speroni
 Pepe Armil
 Roberto Mosca
 Luis Corradi

See also
 List of submissions to the 50th Academy Awards for Best Foreign Language Film
 List of Argentine submissions for the Academy Award for Best Foreign Language Film

References

External links
 

1977 films
1970s Spanish-language films
1977 drama films
Films directed by David José Kohon
Argentine drama films
1970s Argentine films